Scott Dianda (born April 11, 1971) was a member of the Michigan House of Representatives, first elected in 2012. The district consists of Baraga, Gogebic, Houghton, Iron, Keweenaw and Ontonagon counties, as well as Powell and Ishpeming Townships in Marquette County. Prior to his election, Dianda was president of the Village of Calumet.

Dianda announced on April 3, 2017 that he would run for the 38th district of the Michigan Senate. Dianda lost the general election on November 6, 2018, after advancing from the primary on August 7, 2018.

References

External links 
 Scott Dianda at votesmart.org

Living people
Democratic Party members of the Michigan House of Representatives
People from Calumet, Michigan
21st-century American politicians
1971 births